Heterogeneous nuclear ribonucleoprotein R is a protein that in humans is encoded by the HNRNPR gene.

Function 

This gene belongs to the subfamily of ubiquitously expressed heterogeneous nuclear ribonucleoproteins (hnRNPs). The hnRNPs are RNA-binding proteins and they complex with heterogeneous nuclear RNA (hnRNA). These proteins are associated with pre-mRNAs in the nucleus and appear to influence pre-mRNA processing and other aspects of mRNA metabolism and transport. While all of the hnRNPs are present in the nucleus, some seem to shuttle between the nucleus and the cytoplasm. The hnRNP proteins have distinct nucleic acid binding properties. The protein encoded by this gene has three repeats of RRM domains that bind to RNAs and also contains a nuclear localization motif.

HNRNPR, together with its main RNA interacting partner, 7SK, is essential for axon growth in motoneurons. Depletion of HNRNPR from primary motoneurons inhibits axonal development, but it does not lead to enhanced loss of motor neurons. It also plays an important role in axonal β-actin mRNA translocation, binding directly to the 3'-UTR of β-actin mRNA. 

HNRNPR enhances c-fos transcription in vitro by forming a complex with PC4 and Mediator cofactors.

Interactions 

HNRNPR has been shown to interact with SMN1, PRMT1, TDP-43, and FUS/TLS.

References

Further reading

External links